Furkajoch (el. 1761 m.) is a high mountain pass in the Austrian Alps in the Bundesland of Vorarlberg.

It connects the valley of the Bregenzer Ach (Bregenzer Wald) near Damüls with the Frutz valley near Laterns.

The road is very popular with motorcycle riders and is closed in winter.

See also
 List of highest paved roads in Europe
 List of mountain passes

External links

 Profile on climbbybike.com

Mountain passes of the Alps
Mountain passes of Vorarlberg
Bregenz Forest Mountains